FC Encamp is an Andorran football club based in Encamp. Founded in 1950, it is the oldest football club of the Andorran First Division. The club currently plays in Primera Divisió.

History
FC Encamp was founded in 1950 being the dean of the Andorran premier league and the second football club created in the pyrenean country of Andorra after FC Andorra (founded in 1942). Successfully the team won the Primera Divisió in the 1995–96 season, and five years later their second league title (2001–02) qualifying for the UEFA Cup. Next season they ended the regular league in the 2nd position being able to play in the UEFA Intertoto Cup.

Although for the 2004/05 season they were relegated to Segona Divisió, the 2nd best division. In 2005–06, they were promoted back to the Primera Divisió. The same story was repeated in the 2006–07 season finishing in 7th place of the table and being relegated, coming back in 2009 at the top league.

However, during two bad seasons in the Andorran Premier League finally FC Encamp were relegated in 2011, returning the 2011–12 season in the top flight. Since then the club have been playing in the top tier of Andorra.

At the end of the 2015–16 season Encamp finished 7th in the regular season and were originally set to compete in a two-legged relegation play-off against CE Carroi. It was announced that Encamp were awarded the tie against CE Carroi 3-0 due illegal lineup during the first leg of the relegation play-offs, therefore Encamp remained in the top flight.

Colours and badge
FC Encamp takes the colours from the parish of Encamp. Since their foundation blue have been the traditional colour of the Andorran club. Although white and blue, along with red or purple, represent also the club and the northern parish.

Colours are blue and white hoop/striped shirts and blue shorts for home matches, and red and white hoop/striped shirts and red shorts for away matches. Although some seasons the club have worn blue shirts and black/white shorts for home matches.

Facilities and Stadium
FC Encamp is the only club of Primera Divisió that has its own stadium along with the local government of Encamp. The stadium with 550 capacity (Camp de Futbol d'Encamp) and all the club facilities (training center and outdoor stadium) are located in Prada de Moles, inaugurated in November 2015. The club also owns a futsal indoor stadium (Complex Esportiu Federic Palmitjavila).

Honours
Primera Divisió:
Winners (2): 1995–96, 2001–02
Runners-up (1): 2002–03
Copa Constitució:
Runners-up (1): 2000
Segona Divisió:
Winners (3): 2005–06, 2008–09, 2011–12

European results

League history

Current squad

References

External links
FC Encamp Official Web
Club profile at UEFA

 
Football clubs in Andorra
Association football clubs established in 1950
1950 establishments in Andorra